Ride with the Devil is a 1999 American Revisionist Western film directed by Ang Lee and starring Tobey Maguire, Skeet Ulrich, Jeffrey Wright, and Jewel in her feature film debut. Based on the novel Woe to Live On, by Daniel Woodrell, the film, set during the American Civil War, follows a group of men who join the First Missouri Irregulars, also known as the Bushwhackers—guerrilla units loyal to pro-Confederacy units of the state—and their war against Northern Jayhawkers allied with the Union army. Simon Baker, Jonathan Rhys Meyers, Jonathan Brandis, Jim Caviezel, Mark Ruffalo, and Celia Weston are featured in supporting performances.

The film was a co-production between Universal Studios and Good Machine. Principal photography began on March 25, 1998. Theatrically, it was commercially distributed by the USA Films division of Universal and premiered in only six theaters nationwide in the United States on November 26, 1999, and for only three days, grossing a total of $635,096. Taking into account its $38 million budget costs, the film was considered a major box office bomb.

Ride with the Devil has been noted for its thematic exploration of politics, violence and war. In 2010, The Criterion Collection released a restored high-definition digital transfer for the home media market, featuring an extended 148-minute director's cut of the film.

Plot
Jake Roedel and Jack Bull Chiles are friends in Missouri when the Civil War breaks out. Roedel is the American-assimilated son of a German immigrant who suffers from sporadic anti-German suspicion from other Southerners (as the German population in the state was largely sympathetic to the Union) while Chiles is the son of planter Asa Chiles.

One night, Jake watches as Asa is executed by a band of Jayhawkers. Jack manages to escape, and he and Jake join the First Missouri Irregulars under "Black" John Ambrose, an informal unit loyal to the Confederate government of Missouri. Also fighting with Ambrose are George Clyde and Daniel Holt, who most assume is Clyde's slave; Jake learns that Clyde bought Holt his freedom after Holt, whom Clyde had known since childhood, helped him kill the Union soldiers who shot his father and brothers. However, Holt was separated from his mother, who was sold to a new master in Texas.

The Irregulars use guerrilla warfare tactics against the Jayhawkers, supported by the pro-Confederate citizens of Missouri. During their travels, Jake is notified that his father was killed by Alf Bowden, a Unionist whose life Jake spared, in revenge for those slain by the Irregulars. With winter approaching, Ambrose sends Jake, Jack, Holt, and Clyde to hide on the property of the Evans family. A young widow in the household, Sue Lee Shelley, becomes romantically involved with Jack. With Clyde off to romance a female friend on a nearby farm and Chiles occupied with Sue Lee, a friendship begins between Jake and Holt.

Jack is severely wounded when the group goes after the Jayhawkers who killed the Evans patriarch. With Union soldiers in the area, a nervous Clyde abandons the group to rejoin the Irregulars. Jake, Holt, and Sue Lee try to amputate Jack's injured arm, but he dies from complications of gangrene. After burying him, Jake and Holt escort Shelley to the Brown family homestead and entrust her to them while they ride off to find Clyde. In the process, they learn that the Union army has managed to isolate and hunt down many of their former comrades.

The Irregulars join forces with the guerrillas led by William Quantrill, who plans to raid Lawrence, Kansas. The pro-South forces easily overcome the small garrison of troops guarding Lawrence, burn and loot shops and homes, and kill Union supporters and black freedmen. A disgusted Jake and Holt walk into a nearby restaurant to eat breakfast. Pitt Mackeson, a sadistic guerrilla who despises Jake for being Ambrose's favorite, enters the establishment and threatens the owners before Jake and Holt force him to leave at gunpoint.

As the guerrillas make their escape, Union troops pursue them into the woods. Quantrill and Ambrose organize the men to feign retreat and form battle lines, enabling them to hold off the pursuit. Mackeson tries to shoot Jake from behind, and when Holt angrily tries to fire back, a bullet hits him in the side. Clyde rushes to his aid, only to get shot through the throat and die right in Holt's arms. Jake is able to pull Holt to safety, and the two men flee on horseback.

Returning to the Brown family, they spend some time recuperating. With both Jack and Clyde gone, Jake and Holt reflect on their futures; Jake admits that he doesn't want to return to the Irregulars as he feels that the war is turning against the Confederacy, while Holt confides that although he was not Clyde's slave, he feels "free" now that his friend is gone. Shelley gives birth to Jack's daughter, Grace. The Browns, who assume Jake is the child's father, pressure him to marry Shelley, which he is reluctant to do. However, after spending time with Shelley and her child, Jake begins to have feelings for both of them.

News arrives that Quantrill has fled to Kentucky and Mackeson and the surviving Irregulars are now outlaws who pillage both Unionists and defenseless Southerners for anything of value. Jake is warned that Mackeson intends to settle the business between them soon. Mr. Brown secretly invites a local priest into his home to marry Jake and Shelley, and they spend the night together. Jake shaves and cuts his hair, something he swore he would never do until the war was over and prepares a wagon to take him and his new family to California.

While making camp, he and Holt run into Mackeson, who is on the run and increasingly suicidal after learning of both Quantrill and Ambrose's deaths. Mackeson declares that he will ride into the nearest Union-occupied town for drinks even though doing so would mean certain death; his unhinged manners lead Jake and Holt to draw their guns in self-defense. However, after drinking a cup of brewed chicory offered to him by Jake, Mackeson simply rides off.

With his service now complete, Holt tells Jake that he is heading to Texas in the hopes of finally freeing his mother from slavery. After the two friends shake hands and exchange farewells, Holt tips his hat to Jake and rides away.

Cast

Analysis
Film scholar Stephen Teo notes that the film approaches themes of "domesticity, the role of women, homosociality, and violence...  with great sensitivity."

Many critics have noted that the film does little to orient or guide its audience through the historical landscape in which it is set, and instead presents events in a manner that is "unremarkable," "undemonstrative," and "somewhat ghostly." Writer Andrew Patrick Nelson considers Ride with the Devil as being part of the revisionist Western tradition, though he concedes that it "has little of the self-consciousness that generally marks the form." Nelson asserts that director Ang Lee often forgoes excessive attention to historical details, and instead attempts to immerse the audience in an experience that "is responsive to the daily realities and rhythms that surround the characters." It is because of this that Nelson claims the film has more in common with "metaphysical" works of filmmakers such as Terrence Malick."

Production

Casting and set design
The leading actors were required to go through three weeks of boot camp to prepare them for their roles. During shooting, Maguire hesitated under the grueling heat and 16-hour workdays, but pressed on to complete the filming. The actors first trained shooting blank loads, and then live ammunition for action conflict scenes. More than 250 Civil War black-powder pistols were used during the production phase. Over 140 extras played Lawrence residents, and more than 200 Civil War re-enactors were brought in to relay their style of living to the filming sequences.

Principal photography began on March 25, 1998. Filming took place primarily on location in Sibley, Missouri, Kansas City, Kansas, and Kansas City, Missouri. Pattonsburg, Missouri also stood in as a primary filming set locale. The set design production team removed telephone poles and utilized truckloads of dirt to cover existing asphalt and concrete. Production designer Mark Friedberg created numerous indoor and outdoor sets of the time period to ensure and maintain historical accuracy.

Music and soundtrack
The original motion picture music for Ride with the Devil, was released by the Atlantic Records music label on November 23, 1999. The score for the film was orchestrated by Mychael Danna and Nicholas Dodd. Musical artist Jewel contributed vocals to the score with her song "What's Simple Is True", from her 1998 album Spirit.

Marketing

Novel
The basis for the film, Daniel Woodrell's novel Woe to Live On (originally published in 1987) was released as a movie tie-in edition, re-titled Ride With the Devil, by Pocket Books on November 1, 1999. The book dramatizes the events of the American Civil War during the 1860s, as depicted in the film. It expands on the inner-fighting between rebel Bushwhackers and Union Jayhawkers, with civilians caught in the crossfire. The story relates a coming-of-age experience for Roedel as he emotionally comprehends the losses of his best friend, father and comrades. On a separate front, Roedel expresses love for his best friend's widow, and learns about tolerance from his contact with a reserved black Irregular.

Release
Ride with the Devil received its world premiere at the 25th Deauville American Film Festival in France on September 9, 1999. The following day it had its North American premiere at the Toronto Film Festival in Canada. The film's UK premiere was at the opening night gala of the London Film Festival on November 3, 1999.

Box office
Ride with the Devil had an initial screening on November 24, 1999, in New York City, Kansas City, Missouri and Los Angeles. For most of its limited release, the film fluctuated between 11 and 60 theater screening counts. At its most competitive showing, the filmed ranked in 37th place for the December 17–19 weekend in 1999.

The film premiered in cinemas on November 26, 1999, in limited release throughout the United States. During that weekend, the film opened in 50th place grossing $64,159 in business showing at 11 locations. The film Toy Story 2 opened in 1st place during that weekend with $57,388,839 in revenue. The film's revenue dropped by almost 20% in its second week of release, earning $51,600. For that particular weekend, the film fell to 53rd place although with an increased theater count showing at 15 theaters. Toy Story 2 remained unchallenged in 1st place with $18,249,880 in box office business. During its final week in release, Ride with the Devil opened in 57th place grossing $39,806. For that weekend period, Stuart Little starring Geena Davis opened in 1st place with $11,214,503 in revenue. Ride with the Devil went on to top out domestically at $635,096 in total ticket sales through a 6-week theatrical run. For 1999 as a whole, the film would cumulatively rank at a box office performance position of 219.

Critical response
Among mainstream critics in the U.S., the film received generally positive reviews. Rotten Tomatoes reported that 63% of 65 sampled critics gave the film a positive review, with an average score of 6.2 out of 10. At Metacritic, which assigns a weighted average out of 100 to critics' reviews, Ride with the Devil received a score of 69 based on 29 reviews. The film failed to garner any award nominations for its acting or production merits from accredited film organizations.

Peter Stack, writing in the San Francisco Chronicle, said in outward positive sentiment, "Lee's approach mixes an unsettling grittiness with an appealing, often luminous elegance (thanks to Frederick Elmes' cinematography) in picturing a patch of America at war with itself." Left impressed, Stephen Hunter in The Washington Post, wrote that the film was "terrific" and that it contained the "most terrifying kind of close-in gunplay, with big, pulsing holes blown into human beings for a variety of reasons ranging from the political to the nonsensical." In a mixed to positive review, Stephen Holden of The New York Times, described the film's production aspects as being of "meditative quality and its attention to detail and the rough-hewn textures of 19th-century life are also what keep the story at a distance and make "Ride with the Devil" dramatically skimpy, even though the movie stirs together themes of love, sex, death and war." Wesley Morris of The San Francisco Examiner, commented that Ride with the Devil was "downright hot-blooded in the nameless violence going on west of marquee Civil War battles. Never has this war been filmed with such ragged glory. The boys grasping their rifles look like trigger-happy rock stars of the prairies, so much so that they threaten to transform the film into a great hair movie." In a slightly upbeat conviction, Andrew O'Hehir of Salon.com asserted that "for all its clumsy dialogue and loose plotting, this is historical filmmaking of a high order, both visually and thematically ambitious." Todd McCarthy of Variety, added to the exuberant tone by declaring, "Impressing once again with the diversity of his choices of subject matter and milieu, director Ang Lee has made a brutal but sensitively observed film about the fringes of the Civil War".

The film was not without its detractors. Writing for the Chicago Sun-Times, Roger Ebert bluntly noted that the motion picture "does not have conventional rewards or payoffs, does not simplify a complex situation, doesn't punch up the action or the romance simply to entertain. But it is, sad to say, not a very entertaining movie; it's a long slog unless you're fascinated by the undercurrents." In a primarily negative review, Lisa Schwarzbaum writing for Entertainment Weekly, called the film "an oddly unengaging one, not because of any weak performances (even crooning poetess Jewel acquits herself pleasantly in her film debut), but because the waxy yellow buildup of earnest tastefulness (the curse of the Burns school of history) seals off every character from our access." Describing a favorable opinion, Russell Smith of The Austin Chronicle professed the film as exhibiting "unostentatious originality, psychological insight, and stark beauty". While following up, he stressed "There's an odd blend of stylization and extreme realism to this film. The dialogue is stilted, full of archaic $20-words and dime-novel flamboyance — all the more jarring when delivered by these teenaged bumpkin characters."

James Berardinelli of ReelViews proclaimed Ride with the Devil "takes us away from the big battles of the East and to a place where things are less cleanly defined." He also stated that "As was true almost everywhere else, idealogical gulfs often divided families. This is the terrain into which Lee has ventured, and the resulting motion picture offers yet another effective and affecting portrait of the United States' most important and difficult conflict." David Sterritt writing for The Christian Science Monitor reasoned, "The movie is longer and slower than necessary, but it explores interesting questions of wartime violence, personal integrity, and what it means to come of age in a society ripping apart at the seams." Film critic Steve Simels of TV Guide was consumed with the nature of the subject matter exclaiming, "A nicely ambiguous ending and terrific acting by the mostly young cast mostly makes up for the longeurs, however, and for the record, Jewel acquits herself well in a not particularly demanding role."

In 2013, the film was the subject of an essay in a collection of scholarly essays on Ang Lee's films, The Philosophy of Ang Lee.

Home media
Following its cinematic release in theaters, the Region 1 Code widescreen edition of the film was released on DVD in the United States on July 18, 2000. Special features for the DVD include; Jewel music video: "What's Simple Is True", the Theatrical Trailer, Production notes, Cast and filmmakers extra, and a Universal web link.

The Criterion Collection released a restored special edition on DVD and Blu-ray on April 27, 2010. It includes a 148-minute extended cut of the film. Special features include; Two audio commentaries one featuring Lee and producer-screenwriter James Schamus and one featuring Elmes, sound designer Drew Kunin, and production designer Mark Friedberg; a new video interview with star Jeffrey Wright, and a booklet featuring essays by critic Godfrey Cheshire and Edward E. Leslie, author of The Devil Knows How to Ride: The True Story of William Clarke Quantrill and his Confederate Raiders.

The film is also available in video on demand formats, as well.

References

Sources

Further reading

External links
 
 
 
 
 
 
 
 
 Ride with the Devil: Apocalypse Then an essay by Godfrey Cheshire at the Criterion Collection

1999 films
1999 Western (genre) films
African Americans in the American Civil War
American Civil War films
American Western (genre) epic films
American war epic films
1990s English-language films
Films about American slavery
Films about race and ethnicity
Films based on American novels
Films based on Western (genre) novels
Films based on military novels
Films directed by Ang Lee
Films produced by James Schamus
Films scored by Mychael Danna
Films set in Missouri
Films set in the 1860s
Films shot in Kansas
Films shot in Missouri
Films with screenplays by James Schamus
Kansas in the American Civil War
Missouri in the American Civil War
War films based on actual events
Guerrilla warfare in film
Epic films based on actual events
1990s American films